West Haven Board of Education, also known as West Haven School District, is the school district of West Haven, Connecticut.

History
Circa 2008 Neil Cavallaro, an alumnus of West Haven High, became the superintendent.

In 2021 there were members of the school community suggesting that, because of the coronavirus aid money it received, it should increase its paraprofessional wages. Jim Morrissey, a member of the school board, favored the union-negotiated wages but argued the paraprofessional pay was "paltry".

Schools
 High school
 West Haven High School
 Middle schools
 Harry M. Bailey Middle School
 Intermediate schools
 May V. Carrigan Intermediate School
 Elementary schools
 Forest Elementary School
 Seth G. Haley Elementary School
 Edith E. Mackrille Elementary School
 Alma E. Pagels Elementary School
 Savin Rock Community School
 Washington Elementary School

References

External links
 West Haven Board of Education
School districts in Connecticut
Education in New Haven County, Connecticut